Sheikha Al-Zain Sabah Al-Naser Al-Sabah also Al-Zain S. Al-Sabah (Arabic: الشيخة الزين الصباح ) is the Ambassador of Kuwait to the United States.

Formerly, Al-Zain held the position of Chairperson and CEO of National Creative Industries Group (NCIG) KSCC, a Kuwait-based organization that aids in the facilitation, incubation, and expansion of the creative arts and TMT-based industries in the MENA region.  Prior to that, Al-Zain served as Under Secretary of State at the Ministry for Youth Affairs in Kuwait, a start-up government agency responsible for developing national policies that support "innovation, civic engagement and entrepreneurship" amongst Kuwaiti youth.  Under her helm, Kuwait was named the Capital of Arab Youth and the country saw the drafting of its first national youth policy.

Career and background 

Sheikha Al-Zain is a pioneering social entrepreneur and film/TV producer.  Her mission has centered around building equitable policies for creative communities in the larger MENA region, whilst providing a haven for talented regional storytellers to operate.  The majority of her undertakings center around messages of peace and plurality. 

In 2009, she co-produced "Amreeka", an official selection at the 2009 Sundance Film Festival.  The film went on to win both the Fipresci Prize at the Cannes Film Festival, and the Best Film Award at the Cairo International Film Festival. 

Al-Zain also co-produced "Journey to Mecca", an award-winning documentary about Islamic scholar Ibn Battuta's journey from Morocco to Saudi Arabia.

In her former role as Chairperson and CEO of National Creative Industries Group (NCIG) KSCC, an organization she founded to produce impact-driven content that bridges the dichotomy between the eastern and western markets, Al-Zain oversaw the completion of the company’s multi-media studio campus, the largest privately held facility of its kind in the region, and hub for a number of acclaimed regional TV shows. Alongside its production and facilitation sectors, the organization also runs a robust incubation arm, and has partnered with Netflix to build and operate their first writers’ incubator/accelerator in the MENA region.  

Prior to heading NCIG, Al-Zain served as the Undersecretary of State for Youth Affairs in Kuwait, where she spearheaded a number of initiatives, including building the country’s first short film fund, drafting the first local National Youth Policy, and working with the Arab League on programs that resulted in the naming of Kuwait as the “Youth Capital of the Middle East”.  

A vocal proponent for inclusion and diversity in the media/entertainment sectors, Al-Zain serves on the board of several organizations including Boston University’s COM Board, the Equality Now Board, the 10 Arts Foundation at the New York Film Academy, and formerly, the OSN Board of Directors, where she served as Vice-Chair.   

Prior to her ventures in the private and public sectors, Al Zain worked in Boston and in New York, where she was on staff at ABC World News Tonight with Peter Jennings. She had also worked as producer on a number of Kuwaiti political talk shows.  

A recipient of the Arab Woman Award for “Inspirational Woman of the Year 2015”, the Leaders Middle East “Power Women of Arabia” Award 2015, the United Arab Media Council’s 2017 “Haithem Media Award”, and the Boston University College of Communication's Distinguished Alumni Award for Service to Profession 2010, Al-Zain is a MELI fellow at the Aspen Institute and holds a B.S. in Journalism from Boston University's Collection of Communication as well as an M.F.A. from the University of Southern California’s School of Cinematic Arts.

References

Zain
Zain 
Women film producers
Women diplomats
Leaders